John William Maxwell "Max" Thomas (born 11 May 1945) is a former Australian rules footballer who played with for the Carlton Football Club in the Victorian Football League (VFL).

Notes

External links 

Max Thomas's profile at Blueseum

1945 births
Carlton Football Club players
Traralgon Football Club players
Australian rules footballers from Victoria (Australia)
Living people